Zahray-ye Pain Rural District is a rural district (dehestan) in the Central District of Buin Zahra County, Qazvin Province, Iran. At the 2006 census, its population was 8,948, in 2,082 families.  The rural district has 21 villages.

References 

Rural Districts of Qazvin Province
Buin Zahra County